Roderick Henry Scribner (October 10, 1910 – December 21, 1976) was an American animator best known for his work on the Looney Tunes and Merrie Melodies series of cartoons from Warner Bros. Cartoons. He worked during the Golden age of American animation.

Early life 
Scribner had an interest in drawing in high school. Drawing was one of his subjects (along with English and political science) when he attended Denison University for three years. Later, after an interlude spent as a manager of a "hunting marsh", he studied art in Toledo, Ohio, and at the Chouinard Art Institute before he joined the Schlesinger animation staff.

Career

Warner Bros. Cartoons
Rod Scribner started as an assistant animator for Friz Freleng in 1935, then as a animator for Ben Hardaway and Cal Dalton (and, briefly, Chuck Jones). Following the dissolution of Hardaway and Dalton's unit in 1939, he joined Tex Avery's unit and worked with Robert McKimson, Charles McKimson, Virgil Ross, and Sid Sutherland.

In late 1941, after Tex Avery left to direct Speaking of Animals series for Jerry Fairbanks Productions, he was replaced as the unit director by Bob Clampett. Scribner's animation matched Clampett's expansive and energetic cartoons. This was caused by Scribner animating in ink with a pen or a brush, and since Scribner's animation, in Bill Melendez's words, was "very bold and kind of dirty", it would cause crises in the Ink and Paint Department, and the women had to choose which lines to trace.  Clampett classics such as A Tale of Two Kitties (1942), Coal Black and de Sebben Dwarfs (1943), and The Great Piggy Bank Robbery (1946) showcase some of his trademark "Lichty style" of animation, which he proposed to Clampett. Clampett left Warner Bros. in 1945 to pursue a career in puppetry and television. Following Clampett's departure, Scribner was transferred to the unit of recently-promoted fellow Clampett alumnus Robert McKimson, although Scribner would only animate on a small number of shorts prior to being hospitalized in late 1945.

He briefly was a cartoonist on Happy Comic's Rowdy Runner and a January 1945 issue of a military magazine called "Service Ribbin". There are some claims from Scribner's family that Chuck Jones stole the Road Runner from Scribner, including a claim from Scribner's son Ty, who claims that he saw a Coyote chasing a Road Runner and that Scribner "pitched" it to Jones, although this claim is very unlikely and dubious since Scribner was at McKimson's unit.

After being in the hospital for 3 years, Scribner returned to Warner Bros. in 1948 under Robert McKimson's unit. His animation was tamed down to McKimson's standards, but he still got away with energetic scenes, like in Hillbilly Hare (1950), Hoppy Go Lucky (1952) and Of Rice and Hen (1953).

According to Warner Brothers animator Lloyd Turner in an interview, Scribner was irresponsible at McKimson's unit and was thoroughly crazy. Turner says Scribner did a lot of weird things including burning his house down, and that he had a disdain towards his colleague Arthur Davis, although it is unknown why but it is presumably because Davis replaced Clampett after his departure. Scribner played a lot of pranks on Davis at McKimson's unit, and one time while Davis was in John W. Burton's and on a telephone line in a phone booth, Scribner elbowed Turner and said to him, "Watch me fix Davis". Scribner went on the other side of the booth and tipped the telephone into a 45 degree angle and it boomed like a bomb. Davis was scared, Scribner tipped the phone back, and Scribner ran and, according to Turner "laughed like he was possessed". When Davis saw him running out, he got mad.

Later career
He was laid off from Warner's in 1953 and worked for UPA, Jay Ward, and Storyboard Inc. from the 50's to the mid 60's. When Scribner went to work at Bakshi Studios, he sat down with Bakshi and said to him, "Ralph, I can't do this anymore. I love what you're doing, and this is going to be the greatest studio in the world, but I just can't do it anymore." He cried while he was speaking and handed his scene in. Bakshi recalled the scene looking "absolutely hideous" and looking like something was wrong with him, which ironically, there was. Although Scribner was credited, most of his animation were thrown out or overhauled. In his later years, Scribner worked with former colleague Bill Melendez on various Charlie Brown movies and television specials that worked in Snoopy Come Home (1972), There's No Time for Love, Charlie Brown (1973) and It's the Easter Beagle, Charlie Brown (1974), eventually starting at a studio called Playhouse Pictures, which produced commercials for over 45 years. The only things he didn't do for UPA or his former colleague Melendez is a 1968 training video for IBM called A Computer Glossary and two credits on the first two episodes of Yogi's Gang.

Death and legacy 

After being arrested and put on suicide watch in Patton State Hospital, Scribner died there on December 21, 1976, from tuberculosis, which he had contracted during World War II in 1945 during the production of One Meat Brawl and due to an outbreak of the disease during the war, in which he didn't return to Warners until March 1948. His last project was Race For Your Life, Charlie Brown, released posthumously in Summer 1977. Bill Plympton says his work on Coal Black "is a masterpiece of animation and distortion" and that the animation in the Clampett cartoons blew his mind. Cartoon Brew puts him on Number 18 on the list of "25 Great Cartoonists You Should Know" John Kricfalusi is a "Scribner fanatic" and is the reason why he has a despise for Disney animation.

Partial filmography

Warner Bros. 
A Tale of Two Kitties
Hare Ribbin'
All This and Rabbit Stew
A Corny Concerto
The Great Piggy Bank Robbery
Private Snafu
Of Rice and Hen
The Night Watchman
Falling Hare
Gruesome Twosome
Russian Rhapsody
Draftee Daffy
A Wild Hare
The Prize Pest
Quack Shot
An Itch in Time
Porky's Hare Hunt
A-Lad-In Bagdad
Tortoise Wins by a Hare
Bars and Stripes Forever
Nutty News

Commercials 
Kool Aid (1964–65) (mostly directed by Tex Avery and features Bugs and Elmer)
Hawaiian Punch (1961–1975)
Cheerios with Rocky and Bullwinkle (1960s)
Bank of America
Foremost
ABC Saturday Morning

John Hubley 
 A Herb Alpert and the Tijuana Brass Double Feature
Urbanissimo

Bakshi Productions 
Fritz the Cat

Peanuts 
Race For Your Life, Charlie Brown
Snoopy Come Home

References

Notes

External links 

A letter concerning the circumstances a few years before his death.

1910 births
1976 deaths
20th-century deaths from tuberculosis
American animators
American animated film producers
Warner Bros. Cartoons people
Hanna-Barbera people
Tuberculosis deaths in California